The 11th Cinemalaya Independent Film Festival was held from August 7–15, 2015 in Metro Manila, Philippines. This is the first time that only short films would be presented. Feature films would be  presented in next year's edition. Brillante Mendoza's Taklub opened the festival.

Entries
The winning film is highlighted with boldface and a dagger.

Short films

Awards
The awards ceremony was held on August 15, 2015 at the Tanghalang Aurelio Tolentino, Cultural Center of the Philippines.

Short films
 Best Short Film – Pusong Bato by  Martika Ramirez Escobar
 Special Jury Prize – Wawa by Angelie Mae Macalanda
 Audience Choice Award – Sanctissima by Kenneth Dagatan 
 Best Direction – Petersen Vargas for 
 Best Screenplay – Darwin Novicio for Papetir
 NETPAC Award – Wawa by Angelie Mae Macalanda

References

External links
Cinemalaya Independent Film Festival

Cinemalaya Independent Film Festival
Cine
Cine
2015 in Philippine cinema